The 2011 Women's European Volleyball Championship was the 27th edition of the European Volleyball Championship, organised by Europe's governing volleyball body, the Confédération Européenne de Volleyball. It was hosted in Italy and Serbia from 23 September to 2 October 2011.

Qualification

Format
The tournament was played in two different stages. In the first stage, the sixteen participants were divided in four groups of four teams each. A single round-robin format was played within each group to determine the teams group position, the three best teams of each group (total of 12 teams) progressed to the second stage, with group winners advancing to the quarterfinals while second and third placed advancing to the playoffs.

The second stage of the tournament consisted of a single-elimination, with winners advancing to the next round. A playoff was played (involving group second and third places) to determine which teams joined the group winners in the quarterfinals, followed by semifinals, third place match and final.

Pools composition

Squads

Venues
The tournament was played at four venues in four cities (two in Italy and two in Serbia). Each city hosted a group during the preliminary round. Monza and Belgrade hosted the playoffs and quarterfinals. Belgrade also concluded the championship hosting the semifinals, third place match and final.

Preliminary round

 All times are Central European Summer Time (UTC+02:00).

Pool A
venue: Hala Pionir, Belgrade, Serbia

|}

|}

Pool B
venue: PalaIper, Monza, Italy

|}

|}

Pool C
venue: Crystal Hall, Zrenjanin, Serbia

|}

|}

Pool D
venue: PalaYamamay, Busto Arsizio, Italy

|}

|}

Championship round
venues:
Hala Pionir, Belgrade, Serbia
PalaIper, Monza, Italy
 All times are Central European Summer Time (UTC+02:00).

Playoffs

|}

Quarterfinals

|}

Semifinals

|}
The semifinal and final matches played in Belgrade, Serbia were extremely stormy with more than five thousand Serbian audience. The semifinal match between Serbia and Turkey was fabulously breathtaking, Serbia having got to win against Turkey with a 3:2 score and qualify for the final.

Bronze medal match

|}
In order to get the third place in the tournament Turkey and Italy came to court and both teams wanted it so much to win, but Turkey was the one getting to the bronze medal with a 3:2 win.

Final

|}
At the final match against Germany, Serbia was able to get the title of European Champion in front of its audience, ending the match and the tournament with a 3:2 score once more.

Final standing

1	Ana Lazarević	
2	Jovana Brakočević	
3	Sanja Malagurski	
5	Nataša Krsmanović	
6	Tijana Malešević
7	Brižitka Molnar	
8	Ana Antonijević	
9	Jovana Vesović
10	Maja Ognjenović	
12	Jelena Nikolić	
14	Nađa Ninković	
16	Milena Rašić	
18	Suzana Ćebić (L)
19	Silvija Popović (L)

Individual awards
MVP: 
Best Scorer: 
Best Spiker: 
Best Blocker: 
Best Server: 
Best Setter: 
Best Receiver: 
Best Libero:

References
 Confédération Européenne de Volleyball (CEV)

External links

 Confédération Européenne de Volleyball 
 Standings and results
 Results at todor66.com

2011
European Championship
European Championship,2011
European Championship,2011,Women
2011 in Serbian women's sport
2011 in Italian women's sport
September 2011 sports events in Europe
October 2011 sports events in Europe
European Championship,2011
European Championship,2011